This is a list of productions from the Warner Animation Group, an American animation studio based in Burbank, California, United States. Pictures banner. The company produced its first feature-length film, The Lego Movie, in 2014. Their second production, Storks, was released in 2016, followed by their first spin-off, The Lego Batman Movie, followed in 2017. Warner Animation Group had two releases in a single year twice: The Lego Batman Movie and The Lego Ninjago Movie followed in 2018, they released Smallfoot, followed in 2019, they released The Lego Movie 2: The Second Part, followed in 2020, they released Scoob!, followed in 2021, they released Tom & Jerry and Space Jam: A New Legacy, and followed in 2022, they released DC League of Super-Pets.

WAG's upcoming slate of films includes  Coyote vs. Acme (2023), Toto (2024), The Cat in the Hat (2024), Thing One and Thing Two (2026), and Oh, the Places You'll Go! (2027).

Feature films

Released

Upcoming

Films in development

Short films

Cancelled or inactive projects

Reception

Critical and public reception

Box office performance

Accolades

Academy Awards

Golden Raspberry Awards

See also 
 List of computer-animated films
 List of Warner Bros. theatrical animated feature films

References 



Lists of Warner Bros. films
Warner Bros. Discovery-related lists
Lists of films by studio
American films by studio
Warner Animation Group